Arnold Laver is a British timber merchant based in Sheffield, United Kingdom. Founded by Arnold Laver in 1920, the company has 16 timber depots across the UK, employing over 750 people.

History
Arnold Laver started his business using a hand cart, he made customers pay in advance, bought the wood then delivered it. In its first year, Laver made enough money to buy a horse, named Charlie, to help him with his deliveries.

In 1925 Arnold Laver began negotiations to purchase a much larger site on Bramall Lane and in 1927 the new Olympic Sawmills opened. This site was the Company's head office in later years, with the main depot moving to the old goods-yard off Queens road, as the firm expanded.

The saw mill on Bramall Lane/Shoreham Street has been redeveloped as Arnold Laver's new head office and Anchor Point, a residential complex, which has been built above the offices on the site of the old offices and saw mill. The site is next door to Sheffield United's ground and their hotel development, the company being the club's primary sponsor from 1985 until 1995. The company also redeveloped its site on Queens Road in 2002 and it is now occupied by a B&Q superstore. The Olympic sawmill and trade outlet moved to a new site at Mosborough.

The company now supplies timber and timber based products to a wide range of customers and sectors, including many of the largest civil engineers, the Ministry of Defence, shop-fitters and supplied 50% of all the timber and sheet materials used in building the 2012 Summer Olympics venues.

In 1960 Arnold Laver & Co Ltd diversified and established Laver Leisure, a series of holiday home park in and around Skegness, with over 1400 seasonal holiday homes across 11 different parks.

In December 2007, the company underwent a management buy-in led by Andrew Laver (managing director), Mark Bower (finance director) and the senior management team who were joined by Nigel Petrie, the buy-in candidate and non-executive director. The management acquired the company from the Laver family trust, with financing provided by Yorkshire Bank.

In November 2018, British private equity firm Cairngorm Capital acquired Arnold Laver as part of its buy-and-build strategy to create The National Timber Group. The Group was formed with the aim of consolidating the highly fragmented specialist UK timber merchant market. Arnold Laver's previous shareholders retained ownership of the company's existing property and leisure interests.

Depots
The company has 17 depots across the UK:
Borehamwood
Bradford
Bristol
Coventry
Croydon
Derby
Hull
Kidderminster
Leeds
London
Manchester
Newcastle
Oldbury, West Midlands
Peterborough
Reading
Sheffield Central
Sheffield Mosborough

References

External links
 Arnold Laver website
 Laver Online website

Laver, Arnold
Companies based in Sheffield
Building materials companies of the United Kingdom
British companies established in 1920
1920 establishments in the United Kingdom
Privately held companies of the United Kingdom